The Cusipata District is one of the twelve districts in the Quispicanchi Province in Peru. Created by Law No. 9164 on September 5, 1940, its capital is the town of Cusipata.

Geography 
The most important river of the district is the Willkanuta which crosses the district from south-east to north-west.

Ethnic groups 
The people in the district are mainly indigenous citizens of Quechua descent. Quechua is the language which the majority of the population (81.67%) learnt to speak in childhood, 18.07% of the residents started speaking using the Spanish language (2007 Peru Census).

See also 
 Chachakumayuq
 Ch'aqu
 Hatun Ch'aqu
 Hatun Rit'iyuq
 Tiklla Q'asa
 Tuqtu
 Wasaqucha
 Yuraq Q'asa

References  

  Instituto Nacional de Estadística e Informática. Departamento Cusco. Retrieved on November 1, 2007.